Peter Gill may refer to:

 Peter Gill (playwright) (born 1939), British playwright and former actor
 Peter Gill (VC) (1831–1868), Irish Victoria Cross recipient
 Peter Gill (chemist), recipient of the 1999 Dirac Medal and 2011 Schrödinger Medal of the World Association of Theoretical and Computational Chemists
 Peter Gill (politician) (died 2021), Pakistani politician

Musicians
 Pete Gill (born 1951), former drummer of the bands Saxon and Motörhead
 Peter Gill (FGTH drummer) (born 1964), former drummer of the band Frankie Goes to Hollywood
 Peter Gill (musician) (born 1969), Cheltenham based Musician, Actor, Producer, Playwright

Sportsmen
 Peter Gill (golfer) (1930–2020), English golfer
 Peter Gill (cricketer) (born 1947), English cricketer
 Peter Gill (rugby league) (born 1964), Australian rugby league player